Promesomachilis is a genus of jumping bristletails in the family Machilidae. There are at least two described species in Promesomachilis.

Species
These two species belong to the genus Promesomachilis:
 Promesomachilis cazorlensis Bach, 1984
 Promesomachilis hispanica Silvestri, 1923

References

Further reading

 
 
 
 
 

Archaeognatha
Articles created by Qbugbot